The 1879 Rhode Island gubernatorial election was held on April 2, 1879. Incumbent Republican Charles C. Van Zandt defeated Democratic nominee Thomas W. Segar with 62.09% of the vote.

General election

Candidates
Major party candidates
Charles C. Van Zandt, Republican
Thomas W. Segar, Democratic

Other candidates
Samuel Hill, Independent

Results

References

1879
Rhode Island